María Dolores León Rodríguez (born 1 August 1950), better known as Loles León, is a Spanish actress.

Career 
León travelled to Madrid to start a career as an actress, where she met Pedro Almodóvar during La Movida Madrileña. She has played in Women on the Verge of a Nervous Breakdown (1987), Tie Me Up! Tie Me Down! (1989), The Bilingual Lover (1993), and Libertarias (1996). In 1997, she had her first leading role in Amor de hombre, and played Paloma in Aquí no hay quien viva (2003). In 2016, she played Menchu in La que se avecina as Yoli's mother.

Selected filmography

Film

Television

Awards and nominations

References

External links

1950 births
Living people
Actresses from Barcelona
Chicas Almodóvar
Spanish film actresses
Spanish television actresses
20th-century Spanish actresses
21st-century Spanish actresses